Matt McCorkle is an American sound artist, sound designer and audio engineer based out of New York City.

McCorkle is a founding member of the musical collective cdza.

Music Production
McCorkle has worked with numerous mainstream artists including John Legend, A.R. Rahman, Fabolous, Angel Taylor and Laura Izibor. He created a mobile recording studio to work with artists such as Sublime with Rome, LMFAO, We The Kings, Less Than Jake, New Found Glory, Jonathan Batiste and Tinie Tempah.

Sound Art and Installations 
McCorkle blends augmented audio, audio scripting, ambisonics and field recordings to create a unique soundscape style derived from natural elements. His work has been shown internationally. McCorkle is known for his use of web audio scripting to create interactive audio applications that feature his creations.

Benefit Recordings
McCorkle has engaged in benefit recordings to celebrate prestigious organizations and their efforts to support the musical community. Such an event took place in the summer of 2011 to honor From The Top  and their new Center for the Development of Arts Leaders (CDAL) Boston with the track "And The Sound is Music." Another benefit recording was in early 2011 to celebrate Wingspan Arts    and their extraordinary outreach program with the track "Blackbird (Fly Into The Light)." 
In 2013, McCorkle put on a big band gala in the ballroom of The Hallmark (Battery Park City's senior residence). The goal of the evening was to recreate the zeitgeist of the early 1930s big band era for the center's residents while raising money for Alzheimer's research. The night was recorded and released as a digital download on Bandcamp. All ticket and record sales were benefited the Alzheimer's Foundation of America.

References

External links
Artist Website

Living people
American audio engineers
Year of birth missing (living people)